Z-line may refer to:

J/Z (New York City Subway service)
Z-line (IRC), a type of Internet Relay Chat access ban
Gastroesophageal junction, that joins the oesophagus to the stomach
Z-line, a border that separates and links sarcomeres within a skeletal muscle